Brigitte Vernaillen (born 6 April 1958) is a Belgian sprint canoer who competed in the late 1970s. She was eliminated in the repechages of the K-1 500 m event at the 1976 Summer Olympics in Montreal.

References
Sports-reference.com profile

1958 births
Belgian female canoeists
Canoeists at the 1976 Summer Olympics
Living people
Olympic canoeists of Belgium